Poffert is a dish from the province of Groningen in the Netherlands. It is traditionally made with wheat flour, buckwheat flour, yeast, currants, raisins, milk, eggs, and salt. The batter is cooked au bain-marie in a special tin.

References

External links 
 

Cuisine of Groningen (province)
Dutch cuisine